Croton salutaris is a species of flowering plant in the family Euphorbiaceae, native to southeastern Brazil. Its "dragon's blood" red sap promotes hemostasis and is used by local peoples to stem bleeding from wounds.

References

salutaris
Medicinal plants of South America
Endemic flora of Brazil
Flora of Southeast Brazil
Flora of Paraná (state)
Plants described in 1845